The 1883 Chicago White Stockings season was the 12th season of the Chicago White Stockings franchise, the 8th in the National League and the 6th at Lakefront Park. The White Stockings finished second in the National League with a record of 59–39.

Regular season

Season standings

Record vs. opponents

Roster

Player stats

Batting

Starters by position
Note: Pos = Position; G = Games played; AB = At bats; H = Hits; Avg. = Batting average; HR = Home runs; RBI = Runs batted in

Other batters
Note: G = Games played; AB = At bats; H = Hits; Avg. = Batting average; HR = Home runs; RBI = Runs batted in

Pitching

Starting pitchers
Note: G = Games pitched; IP = Innings pitched; W = Wins; L = Losses; ERA = Earned run average; SO = Strikeouts

Relief pitchers
Note: G = Games pitched; W = Wins; L = Losses; SV = Saves; ERA = Earned run average; SO = Strikeouts

References
1883 Chicago White Stockings season at Baseball Reference

Chicago Cubs seasons
Chicago White Stockings season
Chicago Cubs